Fishbone is the recording debut of alternative group Fishbone. This six-song EP was released in 1985 and captures the band at the height of their early funk/ska era. The track "Party at Ground Zero" remains one of the band's most popular tracks.

The track "V.T.T.L.O.T.F.D.G.F." stands for "Voyage to the Land of the Freeze-Dried Godzilla Farts", as confirmed on the band's website, and is about a government attempt to convince the public that Hiroshima was actually caused by Godzilla farting. "Ugly", while never a single, has become a fan favorite.

Track listing

7.   "Skankin' to the Beat" (bonus track, some vinyl editions)

Personnel
Fishbone
Angelo Moore - saxophone, vocals
Walter A. Kibby II - trumpet, vocals
Kendall Jones - guitars, vocals
Chris Dowd - keyboards, trombone, vocals
John Norwood Fisher - bass, vocals
Philip "Fish" Fisher - drums
Additional personnel
Lisa Grant – vocals on "Lyin' Ass Bitch"
Production
Nancy Donald – design
David Kahne – engineer
Tony Lane – design
David Leonard – engineer, mixing
John Scarpati – photography
Jack Skinner – mastering (Sterling Sound, New York City)

Accolades

References

1985 debut EPs
Fishbone albums
Albums produced by David Kahne